This list comprises all players who have participated in at least one league match for Houston Dynamo since the team's first Major League Soccer season in 2006. Players who were on the roster but never played a first team game are not listed; players who appeared for the team in other competitions (MLS Cup Playoffs, US Open Cup, CONCACAF Champions League, North American SuperLiga, Leagues Cup) but never made an MLS regular season appearance are noted at the bottom of the page.

Players in Bold are still on the roster. As of February 17, 2022

Miscellaneous
  Johnny Alcaraz never played in a league match, but came on as an 81st-minute substitute in an Open Cup match.
  Chris Aloisi never played in a league match, but made two substitute appearances in the Open Cup.
  T. J. Casner never played in a league match, but came on as a 71st-minute substitute in an Open Cup match.
 Conor Donovan never played in a league match, but made an appearance in the Open Cup.
 Jordan Graye never played in a league match, but made an appearance in the Open Cup.
  Nick Hatzke never played in a league match, but made two starts in the Open Cup.
  John Michael Hayden never played in a league match, but made five starts in the Open Cup and four in the CONCACAF Champions League.
 Jorginho James never played in a league match, but made an appearance in the Open Cup.
 Ruben Luna never played in a league match, but made two substitute appearances in the Open cup.
  Mpho Moloi never played in a league match, but made one start in the Open Cup.
 Jhon Montaño never played in a league match, but made one appearance in the Open Cup
 Manny Padilla never played in a league match, but made one appearance in the Open Cup.
 Aldo Quintanilla never played in a league match, but made one appearance in the Open Cup.
  Óscar Recio never played in a league match, but made one start in the Open Cup.
  Colin Rolfe never played in a league match, but came on as a 62nd-minute substitute in an Open Cup match.
  Bryan Salazar never played in a league match, but made one start in the Open Cup.
 Carlos Small never played in a league match, but made one appearance in the Open Cup.
  Josue Soto never played in a league match, but made one substitute appearance in the Open Cup and one in the CONCACAF Champions League.
  Marcus Storey never played in a league match, but came on as an 81st-minute substitute in an Open Cup match.
 Todd Wharton never played in a league match, but made an appearance in the Open Cup.
  Stephen Wondolowski never played in a league match, but made one start in the Open Cup and one in the CONCACAF Champions League.
 Matías Zaldívar never played in a league match, but made one appearance in the Open Cup.

Notes

Sources
  
 

 
Houston Dynamo
Association football player non-biographical articles
Houston Dynamo roster
Houston Dynamo roster